Charles Coster van Voorhout (31 March 1942 – 26 November 2016) was a Dutch field hockey player. He competed in the men's tournament at the 1964 Summer Olympics.

References

External links
 

1942 births
2016 deaths
Dutch male field hockey players
Olympic field hockey players of the Netherlands
Field hockey players at the 1964 Summer Olympics
Sportspeople from Amstelveen